Level Live Wires is a studio album by American hip hop producer Odd Nosdam. It was released on Anticon in 2007. It peaked at number 14 on the Dusted Top 40 Radio Chart in 2007.

Critical reception

At Metacritic, which assigns a weighted average score out of 100 to reviews from mainstream critics, the album received an average score of 79, based on 12 reviews, indicating "generally favorable reviews".

Jo-Ann Greene of AllMusic gave the album 4 stars out of 5, saying: "From blurry dub and chill to doom-laden pieces, ambient sweetness to street noise effects, Nosdam's sounds and samples swirl round and round, coalescing into ever more surprising aural shapes and moods." Joshua Love of Pitchfork gave the album a 7.0 out of 10, calling it "a tightly constructed soundscape that hangs together more cogently than anything he's conceived to date."

Track listing

Personnel
Credits adapted from liner notes.

 Odd Nosdam – everything else
 Dee Kesler – keyboards (2, 7), guitar (2, 7), autoharp (6), noise (9)
 Jel – drums (2, 7, 9)
 Doug McDiarmid – piano (2, 9)
 Josiah Wolf – bass guitar (4, 8)
 Chris Adams – keyboards (4), vocals (4, 8) violin (8), guitar (8)
 Jessica Bailiff – vocals (5)
 Hilde Bialach – cello (6)
 Cosmos Lee – violin (7)
 Yoni Wolf – vocals (7)
 Tunde Adebimpe – vocals (7)
 Antimatter – mastering

References

External links
 

2007 albums
Odd Nosdam albums
Anticon albums